Ansar-VDP Academy is a training institute. It is responsible for the training of Bangladesh Ansar and Village Defense Party in Bangladesh. It is located at Shafipur, Gazipur District.

History
The academy started out as the National Ansar Training Centre in 1975. In 1983 it was changed to Ansar Training School. It was changed to Ansar Academy in 1986 and again to Ansar-VDP Academy in 1995.

References

Vocational education in Bangladesh
Police academies in Bangladesh
1975 establishments in Bangladesh
Organisations based in Gazipur